The 2020 German Figure Skating Championships were held on January 01–03, 2020 at the Eissportzentrum Oberstdorf in Oberstdorf. Skaters competed in the disciplines of men's singles and ladies' singles on the senior level and pair skating and ice dance on the senior, junior, and novice levels. Single skating competitions on the junior and novice levels were held on December 13–15, 2019 at the Eissportzentrum Herzogenried in Mannheim. The results of the national championships were among the criteria used to choose the German teams for the 2020 European Championships, 2020 Winter Youth Olympics, 2020 World Championships and 2020 Junior World Championships.

Medalists

Senior results

Men

Ladies

Pairs

Ice dance

Junior results

Men

Ladies

Pairs

Ice dance

International team selections

Winter Youth Olympics
The entries of the German team for the 2020 Winter Youth Olympics were published on 16 December 2019.

European Championships
Germany's team for the 2020 European Championships was published on 7 January 2020.

World Championships
Russia's team to the 2020 World Championships was published on 18 February 2020.

World Junior Championships
Germany's team for the 2020 World Junior Championships was published on 10 February 2020.

References

External links 

 2020 German Championships: Senior results at the Deutsche Eislauf Union
 2020 German Championships: Junior and novice results at the Deutsche Eislauf Union